In topology and other branches of mathematics, a topological space X is
locally connected if every point admits a neighbourhood basis consisting entirely of open, connected sets.

Background
Throughout the history of topology, connectedness and compactness have been two of the most
widely studied topological properties. Indeed, the study of these properties even among subsets of Euclidean space, and the recognition of their independence from the particular form of the Euclidean metric, played a large role in clarifying the notion of a topological property and thus a topological space. Indeed, while any compact Hausdorff space is locally compact, a connected space—and even a connected subset of the Euclidean plane—need not be locally connected (see below).

This led to a rich vein of research in the first half of the twentieth century, in which topologists studied the implications between increasingly subtle and complex variations on the notion of a locally connected space.  As an example, the notion of weak local connectedness at a point and its relation to local connectedness will be considered later on in the article.

In the latter part of the twentieth century, research trends shifted to more intense study of spaces like manifolds, which are locally well understood (being locally homeomorphic to Euclidean space) but have complicated global behavior. By this it is meant that although the basic point-set topology of manifolds is relatively simple (as manifolds are essentially metrizable according to most definitions of the concept), their algebraic topology is far more complex. From this modern perspective, the stronger property of local path connectedness turns out to be more important: for instance, in order for a space to admit a universal cover it must be connected and locally path connected. Local path connectedness will be discussed as well.

A space is locally connected if and only if for every open set U, the connected components of U (in the subspace topology) are open.  It follows, for instance, that a continuous function from a locally connected space to a totally disconnected space must be locally constant.  In fact the openness of components is so natural that one must be sure to keep in mind that it is not true in general: for instance Cantor space is totally disconnected but not discrete.

Definitions

Let  be a topological space, and let  be a point of 

A locally connected space is a space that is locally connected at each of its points.

A locally path connected space is a space that is locally path connected at each of its points.

Locally path connected spaces are locally connected.  The converse does not hold (see the lexicographic order topology on the unit square).

Connectedness im kleinen

A space is called weakly locally connected if it is weakly locally connected at each of its points; as indicated below, this concept is in fact the same as being locally connected.

However, if a space is connected im kleinen at each of its points, it is locally connected.

However, if a space is path connected im kleinen at each of its points, it is locally path connected.

First examples

 For any positive integer n, the Euclidean space  is locally path connected, thus locally connected; it is also connected.
 More generally, every locally convex topological vector space is locally connected, since each point has a local base of convex (and hence connected) neighborhoods.
 The subspace  of the real line  is locally path connected but not connected.
 The topologist's sine curve is a subspace of the Euclidean plane that is connected, but not locally connected.
 The space  of rational numbers endowed with the standard Euclidean topology, is neither connected nor locally connected. 
 The comb space is path connected but not locally path connected, and not even locally connected.
 A countably infinite set endowed with the cofinite topology is locally connected (indeed, hyperconnected) but not locally path connected.
 The lexicographic order topology on the unit square is connected and locally connected, but not path connected, nor locally path connected.
 The Kirch space is connected and locally connected, but not path connected, and not path connected im kleinen at any point.  It is in fact totally path disconnected.

A first-countable Hausdorff space  is locally path-connected if and only if  is equal to the final topology on  induced by the set  of all continuous paths

Properties

For the non-trivial direction, assume  is weakly locally connected.  To show it is locally connected, it is enough to show that the connected components of open sets are open.

 Local connectedness is, by definition, a local property of topological spaces, i.e., a topological property P such that a space X possesses property P if and only if each point x in X admits a neighborhood base of sets that have property P.  Accordingly, all the "metaproperties" held by a local property hold for local connectedness. In particular:
 A space is locally connected if and only if it admits a base of (open) connected subsets. 
 The disjoint union  of a family  of spaces is locally connected if and only if each  is locally connected.  In particular, since a single point is certainly locally connected, it follows that any discrete space is locally connected.  On the other hand, a discrete space is totally disconnected, so is connected only if it has at most one point.
 Conversely, a totally disconnected space is locally connected if and only if it is discrete.  This can be used to explain the aforementioned fact that the rational numbers are not locally connected.
 Every hyperconnected space is locally connected, and connected.

Components and path components

The following result follows almost immediately from the definitions but will be quite useful:

Lemma: Let X be a space, and  a family of subsets of X.  Suppose that  is nonempty.  Then, if each  is connected (respectively, path connected) then the union  is connected (respectively, path connected).

Now consider two relations on a topological space X: for  write:
 if there is a connected subset of X containing both x and y; and
 if there is a path connected subset of X containing both x and y.

Evidently both relations are reflexive and symmetric.  Moreover, if x and y are contained in a connected (respectively, path connected) subset A and y and z are connected in a connected (respectively, path connected) subset B, then the Lemma implies that  is a connected (respectively, path connected) subset containing x, y and z.  Thus each relation is an equivalence relation, and defines a partition of X into equivalence classes.  We consider these two partitions in turn.

For x in X, the set  of all points y such that  is called the connected component of x.  The Lemma implies that  is the unique maximal connected subset of X containing x.  Since

If X has only finitely many connected components, then each component is the complement of a finite union of closed sets and therefore open.  In general, the connected components need not be open, since, e.g., there exist totally disconnected spaces (i.e.,  for all points x) that are not discrete, like Cantor space.  However, the connected components of a locally connected space are also open, and thus are clopen sets.  It follows that a locally connected space X is a topological disjoint union  of its distinct connected components.  Conversely, if for every open subset U of X, the connected components of U are open, then X admits a base of connected sets and is therefore locally connected.

Similarly x in X, the set  of all points y such that  is called the path component of x.  As above,  is also the union of all path connected subsets of X that contain x, so by the Lemma is itself path connected.  Because path connected sets are connected, we have  for all 

However the closure of a path connected set need not be path connected: for instance, the topologist's sine curve is the closure of the open subset U consisting of all points (x,y) with x > 0, and U, being homeomorphic to an interval on the real line, is certainly path connected.

A space is locally path connected if and only if for all open subsets U, the path components of U are open.  Therefore the path components of a locally path connected space give a partition of X into pairwise disjoint open sets.  It follows that an open connected subspace of a locally path connected space is necessarily path connected.  Moreover, if a space is locally path connected, then it is also locally connected, so for all   is connected and open, hence path connected, that is,   That is, for a locally path connected space the components and path components coincide.

Examples

 The set   (where ) in the dictionary order topology has exactly one component (because it is connected) but has uncountably many path components. Indeed, any set of the form  is a path component for each a belonging to I.
Since   is connected, and the image of a connected space under a continuous map must be connected, the image of  under  must be connected. In fact, any continuous map from a connected space to a totally disconnected space must be constant.

Quasicomponents

Let X be a topological space.  We define a third relation on X:  if there is no separation of X into open sets A and B such that x is an element of A and y is an element of B.   This is an equivalence relation on X and the equivalence class  containing x is called the quasicomponent of x.

 can also be characterized as the intersection of all clopen subsets of X that contain x. Accordingly  is closed; in general it need not be open.

Evidently  for all   Overall we have the following containments among path components, components and quasicomponents at x:

If X is locally connected, then, as above,  is a clopen set containing x, so  and thus   Since local path connectedness implies local connectedness, it follows that at all points x of a locally path connected space we have

Another class of spaces for which the quasicomponents agree with the components is the class of compact Hausdorff spaces.

Examples

 An example of a space whose quasicomponents are not equal to its components is a sequence with a double limit point. This space is totally disconnected, but both limit points lie in the same quasicomponent, because any clopen set containing one of them must contain a tail of the sequence, and thus the other point too.
 The Arens–Fort space is not locally connected, but nevertheless the components and the quasicomponents coincide: indeed  for all points x.

See also
 
 
 It is conjectured that the Mandelbrot set is locally connected

Notes

References
 
 John L. Kelley; General Topology; 
 .
 
 Stephen Willard; General Topology; Dover Publications, 2004.

Further reading
 . For Hausdorff spaces, it is shown that any continuous function from a connected locally connected space into a connected space with a dispersion point is constant
 .

Articles containing proofs
Properties of topological spaces
General topology